{{DISPLAYTITLE:C3H6S}}
The molecular formula C3H6S (molar mass: 74.14 g/mol, exact mass: 74.0190 u) may refer to:

 Allyl mercaptan (AM)
 Thietane
 Thioacetone